Braeden Troyer (born March 19, 1993) is a former American professional soccer player who played for USL League One club Richmond Kickers as a defender.

Club career

College
Troyer played four years of college soccer at the University of South Carolina between 2011 and 2014.

Professional
Troyer signed with United Soccer League club Richmond Kickers on March 24, 2015.

References

External links
Gamecocks profile

1993 births
Living people
American soccer players
Association football defenders
Richmond Kickers players
South Carolina Gamecocks men's soccer players
SC United Bantams players
Soccer players from South Carolina
Sportspeople from Columbia, South Carolina
USL Championship players
USL League Two players
USL League One players